Michael or Mike Carey may refer to:

Sportspeople
Mike Carey (American football) (born 1949), retired American football official in the National Football League 
Mike Carey (basketball) (born 1958), head women's basketball coach for West Virginia University
Michael Carey (basketball player), Bahamian basketball player
Michael Carey (hurler), Irish hurler

Others
Mike Carey (writer) (born 1959), British writer of comic books, novels, and films
Michael Carey (priest) (1913–1985), Anglican Archdeacon of Ely and Dean of Ely
Michael Carey (United States Air Force officer), major general in the United States Air Force
Michael J. Carey (computer scientist), American computer scientist
Mike Carey (politician), politician and coal lobbyist in Ohio